Analog models of gravity are attempts to model various phenomena of general relativity (e.g., black holes or cosmological geometries) using other physical systems such as acoustics in a moving fluid, superfluid helium, or Bose–Einstein condensate; gravity waves in water; and propagation of electromagnetic waves in a dielectric medium. These analogs (or analogies) serve to provide new ways of looking at problems, permit ideas from other realms of science to be applied, and may create opportunities for practical experiments within the analog that can be applied back to the source phenomena.

History 

Analog models of gravity have been used in hundreds of published articles in the last decade. The use of these analogs can be traced back to the very start of scientific theories for gravity, with Newton and Einstein.

Bose-Einstein condensates 
It has been shown that Bose-Einstein condensates (BEC) are a good platform to study analog gravity. Kerr (rotating) black holes have been implemented in a BEC of exciton-polaritons (a quantum fluid of light).

See also
Acoustic metric
Transformation optics
Optical metric#Analogue gravity
Optical black hole
Sonic black hole

References

General relativity